The 2014 Coca-Cola 600, the 55th running of the event, was a NASCAR Sprint Cup Series stock car race held on May 25, 2014, at Charlotte Motor Speedway in Concord, North Carolina. Contested over 400 laps on the  oval, it was the twelfth race of the 2014 NASCAR Sprint Cup Series. Jimmie Johnson won the race, his first of the season and fourth overall Coca-Cola 600 win, while Kevin Harvick finished second and Matt Kenseth, Carl Edwards and Jamie McMurray rounded out the top five. The top rookies of the race were Austin Dillon (16th), Kyle Larson (18th) and Cole Whitt (27th).

Previous race
Two weeks prior at Kansas Speedway, Jeff Gordon held off a last lap charge by Kevin Harvick to win the 5-hour Energy 400. The first night Cup race at Kansas Speedway was delayed about 30 minutes by rain, saw a bank of backstretch lights go out and featured two multi-car crashes. It ended with Gordon, the points leader, scoring his 89th career Sprint Cup victory. "I don't know what it is about this team, this '24' car and us here at Kansas on inaugural days, but I love this place," Gordon said. "What an incredible job ... by this race team. They have been giving me the best racecars all year long. I'm going to be 43 year this, but I feel like I'm 25." Kevin Harvick had one of the strongest cars and was leading before he made his final pit stop but exited behind Gordon and couldn't get around him the rest of the race, finishing second. "What put us in second is I just didn't get down pit road very good. I was paying attention to the fuel pressure gauge instead of the pit lights."

Report

Background

The track's turns are banked at twenty-four degrees, while the front stretch, the location of the finish line, is five degrees. The back stretch, opposite of the front, also had a five degree banking. The racetrack has seats for 134,000 spectators. The defending race winner from 2013 was Kevin Harvick.

Kurt Busch ran the Indianapolis 500 on the same day as the Coca-Cola 600 and started the race in the number 41 Stewart-Haas Racing Chevrolet. In the event Busch could not arrive at the track in time, the team had Parker Kligerman ready to race in Busch's stead. This was the first time a driver attempted the Memorial Day weekend double since Robby Gordon did so in 2004.

Entry list
The entry list for the Coca-Cola 600 was released on Monday, May 19, 2014 at 11:37 a.m. Eastern time. Forty-five drivers were entered for the race.

Practice

First practice results

Qualifying
We did that tonight. We’re hitting on some things that should help us run faster longer.’’ Matt Kenseth and Kevin Harvick didn't get a lap in before time expired in the final round and started eleventh and twelfth as a result. “We had a big miscommunication tonight and didn’t get @KevinHarvick off of pit road in time to run a lap in the final qualifying session,’’ Childers tweeted. “Apologies to all of the sponsors and fans. We will make sure it doesn’t happen again.’’ While three of the Hendrick cars made it to the final round of qualifying, Jeff Gordon didn't make it out of the first round. “It just disappoints us,’’ Gordon said of his qualifying performance. “We know our car is much better than this. These are about as challenging conditions as you can have when you have a really hot day like this and the sun goes down and it’s a total guessing game. We guessed wrong. We just missed the setup. The car has plenty of speed in it, so I’m not concerned about the race.’’ The two drivers who failed to qualify were Dave Blaney and J. J. Yeley.

Qualifying results

Practice (post-qualifying)

Second practice

Final practice
However, he had to start at the back of the field, after crashing during the session, which necessitated a change to a backup car. Joe Gibbs Racing were able to get Busch's backup onto the track for the final 20 minutes of final practice. In his first run Busch radioed that the backup was "not even close to the other one," but by the end the driver was turning competitive laps that would keep him in contention. "We got the backup on the race track, and he ran some decent laps. They were competitive," Jimmy Makar said. "I think it's a good race car, so I think we should be in OK shape there. There were a couple of really fast cars in practice today that you'll have to contend with. But we'll have something he can race with, for sure."

Points leader Jeff Gordon sat out the final practice session due to back spasms. In fact, he only ran 11 laps in the second session before getting out of the car. "It doesn't do me any good to be out there in the car right now especially when the car is as good as it is," Gordon told Fox Sports 1. "It's really about getting prepared for 600 miles. I have no doubts that I can be in this car and be competitive if I take it easy over the next 24 hours." Gordon had a similar problem before the 2009 Coca-Cola 600, where he underwent a facet block procedure a few days before the event. Gordon suffered back spasms Thursday during qualifying. With no track activity Friday, Gordon rested his back but was still in pain Saturday. "I know he'll do everything he can to get in there and go," crew chief Alan Gustafson said about Gordon driving in the race. Nationwide Series championship leader Regan Smith was on standby if Gordon was not able to run the entire race. "We've tested a lot with Regan and have a really good baseline," Gustafson said, noting Smith drove Gordon's car at the NASCAR test at Charlotte in December. "We're real confident knowing what he'll need as far as the car drives."

Race

The Coca-Cola 600 was scheduled to start at 6:18 p.m. but started five minutes late with Jimmie Johnson leading the field to the green flag.

Johnson surrendered the lead on lap 48 to make his first stop of the race. Brad Keselowski assumed the lead.

Keselowski ducked onto pit road on lap 49 and the lead cycled back to Johnson. During the cycle, Marcos Ambrose had to serve a pass-through penalty after an uncontrolled tire left his pit box.

Kevin Harvick took the lead on lap 76.

Harvick hit pit road on lap 96 and handed the lead back to Jimmie Johnson.

Johnson stopped the next lap and the lead cycled back to Kevin.

After going caution-free for the first 108 laps, debris in turn 3 brought out the first caution of the race. Kevin Harvick swapped the lead with Jimmie Johnson, with the former being pitted behind the start/finish line, but exited pit road with the lead.

The race restarted on lap 114.

Debris on the backstretch brought out the second caution of the race on lap 148. As it was the previous caution, Harvick swapped the lead with Johnson. Only this time, Jimmie exited with the lead.

The race restarted on lap 154.

The third caution of the race flew on lap 164 when David Gilliland cut down his right-front tire and slammed the wall in turn 1. Brad Keselowski opted not to pit when the leaders did and moved back to the lead.

The race restarted on lap 170.

Kevin Harvick took back the lead on lap 192.

Harvick hit pit road on lap 213 and handed the lead to Jeff Gordon.

Gordon dove onto pit road on lap 214 and handed the lead to teammate Dale Earnhardt Jr.

Earnhardt Jr. pitted the next lap and the lead went to Jamie McMurray. Teammate Kyle Larson cut down his right-front tire but made it to pit road without any hiccups.

McMurray gave up the lead to pit on lap 216 and Kevin Harvick cycled back to the front.

Debris on the backstretch brought out the fourth caution of the race on lap 223. Dale Earnhardt Jr. didn't pit with the leaders and assumed the lead.

The race restarted on lap 228.

The fifth caution of the race flew on lap 235 when Marcos Ambrose cut down his right-rear tire and spun out exiting turn 4. Landon Cassill got turned by Josh Wise trying to avoid Ambrose. Brian Scott, trying to avoid the spinning Ambrose as well, tagged the wall, bounced into Danica Patrick, hooked her and sent her into the wall. She didn't suffer any damage tagging the wall, but she tore up the left-rear corner panel. Dale Earnhardt Jr. stopped during the caution period and Jamie McMurray moved to the head of the line.

The race restarted on lap 242.

McMurray hit pit road on lap 271 and handed the lead to Matt Kenseth.

The sixth caution of the race flew on lap 274 when Kurt Busch, who had been dealing with dropped cylinders, blew an engine on the backstretch. Busch, who finished sixth in the Indianapolis 500, would finish a disappointing 40th. "It acted like it swallowed three cylinders all at once," he said. "It's kind of a shame. It symbolizes how tough it has been for (my NASCAR) team. I thought it was great racing in traffic. The feel of the stock car right after driving the IndyCar is a feeling I'll never forget." Kurt ended completing 907 of the 1,100 combined miles that make up the Indianapolis 500 and the Coca-Cola 600. Kenseth and Jeff Gordon swapped the lead on pit road, with the former pitted behind the start/finish line, but Jimmie Johnson found himself back in the lead.

The race restarted on lap 283.

The seventh caution of the race flew on lap 286 when Danica Patrick, who was dealing with the same ailments that plagued her teammate Kurt Busch, blew an engine exiting turn 4 and slammed the wall.

The race restarted on lap 294 and Matt Kenseth made his way to the lead.

Jimmie Johnson passed Kenseth in turn 1 to take back the lead on lap 312.

Johnson surrendered the lead to pit on lap 331 and handed the lead to Brad Keselowski.

Keselowski pitted with 57 laps to go and Aric Almirola assumed the lead.

Almirola ducked onto pit road with 56 laps to go and the lead cycled back to Jimmie Johnson.

Johnson made his final pit stop with 27 laps to go and handed the lead to his teammate Jeff Gordon.

Gordon pitted the next lap and handed the lead to Carl Edwards.

The eighth caution of the race flew with 22 laps to go after Alex Bowman  slammed the wall in turn 3. Edwards pitted and handed the lead back to Gordon.

The race restarted with 17 laps to go and Jeff Gordon on two new tires couldn't hold off Matt Kenseth with four.

Jimmie Johnson took the lead with nine laps to go and pulled away from Kevin Harvick to score his first win of the season and first points win at Charlotte Motor Speedway since 2009. In the process, he broke a tie with Bobby Allison for the most wins at Charlotte. “There are more people fretting about things than myself,” said Johnson. “I mean what 12 races? Give me a break. Obviously it’s great to win and we are very happy to win here especially in the backyard of Hendrick Motorsports, Lowe’s headquarters is just up the road as well. I was happy to get by the No. 24 (Jeff Gordon) and then the No. 20 (Kenseth). I wasn't sure I was going to get by both of them, but I did and brought this baby home." “Yeah. We had a fast car all night,” said Harvick. “Just kind of fumbled again on pit road. Got behind, got a lap down. We needed a 700 mile race to get back to where we needed to be.” “Got a good restart, got out front,” said Kenseth. “Unfortunately didn't have enough speed to hold off Jimmie and Kevin and hang on to win.”

Race results

Race statistics
 Lead changes: 34 among different drivers
 Cautions/Laps: 8 for 44
 Red flags: 0      
 Time of race: 4 hours, 7 minutes and 27 seconds
 Average speed:

Media

Television

Radio

Standings after the race

Drivers' Championship standings

Manufacturers' Championship standings

Note: Only the first sixteen positions are included for the driver standings.

Note

References

Coca-Cola 600
Coca-Cola 600
NASCAR races at Charlotte Motor Speedway
Coca-Cola 600